Cham-e Hashem (also Romanized as Cham-e Hāshem and Cham Hashem; also known as Cham Hāshemī) is a village in Soltanabad Rural District, in the Central District of Ramhormoz County, Khuzestan Province, Iran. At the 2006 census, its population was 129, in 23 families.

References 

Populated places in Ramhormoz County